Common names: Aruba rattlesnake, Aruba island rattlesnake, Cascabel (Papiamento).

Crotalus unicolor is a venomous pitviper species found only on the Caribbean island of Aruba, off the coast of Venezuela. It is sometimes still classified as a subspecies of Crotalus durissus.

Description
Moderately sized, this species attains an adult length of approximately 90 cm, and weighs about one kilogram. It is light brown, tan, or almost pink in color, reflecting the soil color of its native habitat, with darker brown diamond-shaped markings, but colors may vary from white to apricot, or brown to slate. The markings are sometimes nearly invisible, or only visible in a narrow stripe down the middle of the back.

Geographic range
The snakes are endemic to the island of Aruba. They exist only in thornscrub and desert habitats on the southeastern half of the island. The type locality given is "Aruba."

Conservation status

These snakes are found only on the island of Aruba, where they are mostly limited to the rocky, dry southern tip of the island. Due to their extremely limited geographic range, about 230 animals are left in the wild, and the ever encroaching human habitation into their territory (with only about 25 square kilometers left undeveloped), the Aruba Island rattlesnake is among the rarest rattlesnakes in the world. Unfortunately, while exporting from the island is illegal, it has no other legal protection on the island either. The snake is now a part of the Species Survival Plan for captive breeding.

Feeding
Its diet consists of rodents, birds and lizards.

Reproduction

Males reach sexual maturity in four years; females in five. After a gestation time of four months, females give birth to between five and fifteen live young at a time.

References

 van Lidth de Jeude, Theodorus Willem. 1887. On a collection of reptiles and fishes from the West-Indies. Notes from the Leyden Museum, 9: 129-139.

External links

 

unicolor
Snakes of the Caribbean
Fauna of Aruba
Reptiles described in 1887